The 1982 Tulane Green Wave football team was an American football team that represented Tulane University during the 1982 NCAA Division I-A football season as an independent. In their third year under head coach Vince Gibson, the team compiled a 4–7 record.

Schedule

References

Tulane
Tulane Green Wave football seasons
Tulane Green Wave football